The 2022–23 Skeleton World Cup was an upcoming multi-race series over a season for skeleton. The season started in Whistler, Canada on 25 November 2022 and finished in Sigulda, Latvia on 17 February 2023. The season sponsor was BMW.

Calendar 
Below is the schedule of the 2022/23 season.

Results

Men

Women

Standings

Men

Women

Medal table

Points

References 

Skeleton World Cup
2022 in skeleton
2023 in skeleton